Panský diel is a nature monument in the Podunajské Biskupice district of Bratislava, Slovakia. The nature monument covers an area of 15,60 ha on the left shore of the Danube. It has a protection level of 4 under the Slovak nature protection system. The protected area is part of the Dunajské luhy Protected Landscape Area.

Description
The area is a part of the Danubian region preserved as a forest-steppe, with the occurrence of different types of critically endangered species of  orchids.

Flora
In the protected area various species of orchids occur, including Orchis militaris, Anacamptis coriophora and Anacamptis morio.

References

Geography of Bratislava Region
Protected areas of Slovakia